The shortlists were announced on 15 December 2016. The results were announced on 18 January 2017.

Eligibility criteria
Players, coaches and referees of any nationality were eligible to be nominated for the awards, as long as they meet at least one of the following criteria:
 Have played/coached/refereed in an official CONCACAF tournament at club or national team level
 Have played/coached/refereed for a CONCACAF member national team in a FIFA-sanctioned international competition
 Have played/coached/refereed in a domestic league within CONCACAF's territory

Female awards

Player of the Year

Goalkeeper of the Year

Coach of the Year

Referee of the Year

Best XI

Male awards

Player of the Year

Goalkeeper of the Year

Coach of the Year

Referee of the Year

Best XI

Mixed-sex

Outstanding Performance Award
  and  John Herdman

Goal of the Year
Goal of the Year applies only to goals scored during CONCACAF or FIFA official competitions or a league game disputed within the CONCACAF region.

References

CONCACAF trophies and awards
Awards
CONCACAF